Lewis Albert Fonseca (January 21, 1899 – November 26, 1989) was an American first baseman, second baseman and manager in Major League Baseball for the Cincinnati Reds, Philadelphia Phillies, Cleveland Indians, and Chicago White Sox. While not a power hitter, he hit for average and was a good contact hitter for most of his career.

In a 12-year major league career, Fonseca posted a .316 batting average (1075-3404), scoring 518 runs, hitting 31 home runs, and compiling 485 RBI in 937 games played. His on-base percentage was .355 and slugging percentage was .432. His career fielding percentage was .983.

Fonseca was one of the first to use film in analyzing baseball games and finding flaws in players. It is said that his interest with cameras began while shooting Slide, Kelly, Slide in 1927. As manager of the Chicago White Sox, he used film extensively. 

After retiring from playing the game, Fonseca teamed with Charley Grimm to call Chicago White Sox and Chicago Cubs radio broadcasts on station WJJD in 1939 in 1940, then was employed as director of promotions for both major leagues. Fonseca worked on World Series highlight films from their inception in 1943 through 1969, as an editor and director, and narrated the World Series films from 1949-53 and 1955-58 (Jack Brickhouse narrated the 1954 World Series film). Television sportscaster Bob Costas wrote of Fonseca's narration: "[his] vocal stylings were somewhat less than mellifluous, but still endlessly entertaining." Fonseca was batting coach for the Chicago Cubs for many years, until quite late in life. His daughter Carolynn was a talented actress who worked mostly out of Rome, Italy.

Fonseca died in Ely, Iowa at age 90.

Managerial record

See also
List of Major League Baseball batting champions
List of Major League Baseball player-managers

References

External links

Interview with Lew Fonseca conducted by Eugene Murdock on June 26, 1976, in Chicago: Part 1, 2
 

1899 births
1989 deaths
American League batting champions
American people of Portuguese descent
Baseball players from Oakland, California
Chicago Cubs announcers
Chicago White Sox announcers
Chicago White Sox managers
Chicago White Sox players
Cincinnati Reds players
Cleveland Indians players
Major League Baseball broadcasters
Major League Baseball first basemen
Major League Baseball player-managers
Major League Baseball second basemen
Philadelphia Phillies players
Saint Mary's Gaels baseball players